Anthony Joseph Sparano III (October 7, 1961 – July 22, 2018) was an American football coach. He served as the head coach of the Miami Dolphins and Oakland Raiders of the National Football League (NFL) and is the only NFL head coach to have led a team to the playoffs the year following a one-win season, and only the second to conduct a ten-game turnaround, both of which he accomplished in his first season with the Dolphins. He was fired by the Dolphins in December 2011 after a 4-9 start to the season, Sparano's worst start in his four-year tenure with the Dolphins.

Sparano was the offensive line coach for the Minnesota Vikings from 2016 until his death in July 2018.

Playing career
Sparano was a four-year letterman for Division II University of New Haven, starting at center for the New Haven Chargers and graduating in 1982. He earned a B.S. in criminal justice from New Haven in 1984.

Coaching career

College
Sparano began his coaching career at his alma mater, serving as New Haven's offensive line coach for four seasons before joining the staff at Division I-AA Boston University. After one year as the team's offensive line coach, Sparano served five seasons as the Terriers' offensive coordinator.

Sparano was named New Haven's head coach in 1994, and led the Chargers to two playoff appearances in five seasons. In 1997, New Haven led Division II in offense (42.8 points per game) and finished second in defense (11.6 points allowed per game) en route to a 12–2 record, losing to Northern Colorado in the championship game.

National Football League

Assistant coach
Beginning his NFL career in 1999, Sparano was fired in three staffing purges after brief stints with the Cleveland Browns, Washington Redskins and Jacksonville Jaguars. Sparano was hired by new Dallas Cowboys coach Bill Parcells in 2003, rising from tight ends coach to assistant head coach in his five seasons in Dallas. Sparano was the offensive play-caller for Dallas in 2006, but ceded the responsibilities to new offensive coordinator Jason Garrett the following season.

Head coach
After firing Cam Cameron following a franchise-worst 1–15 season, the Miami Dolphins and new executive vice president of football operations, Bill Parcells hired Sparano to a four-year contract worth $2,500,000 per year on January 16, 2008.

In his first season, Sparano led the Dolphins to an 11–5 record and the AFC East division title, securing the franchise's first playoff berth in seven seasons before losing to the Baltimore Ravens in a wild-card game. The 10-win turnaround tied an NFL record and Sparano finished one vote behind Atlanta Falcons first-year head coach Mike Smith in balloting for the AP Coach of the Year award.

In the 2009 and 2010 seasons, Sparano led the Dolphins to a 7-9 record and third place in the AFC East. Sparano's Dolphins went 1-7 at home in 2010.  The Dolphins were the subject of much gossip at the end of the 2010 season when team owner Stephen Ross flew across the country with General Manager Jeff Ireland to interview then Stanford University coach Jim Harbaugh.  At the time of the interview with Harbaugh, Sparano was still the team's head coach.  It was also reported by numerous media sources that Ross also spoke with former NFL coaches Jon Gruden and Bill Cowher about the not yet open position. According to reports Bill Cowher told Ross he would not talk to him while he had a head coach in place.

On January 8, 2011, the Dolphins gave Sparano a two-year extension worth $4.5 million, with Ross saying he was the perfect man for the job. However, on December 12, 2011, hours after a week 14 loss to the Philadelphia Eagles, Sparano was fired; secondary coach Todd Bowles finished out the season. The Dolphins bought out his contract for $9 million. Sparano is to date, the last Dolphins head coach to lead them to a division title, an 11-win season, as well as their last head coach with prior head coaching experience.

Return to assistant coaching
On January 11, 2012, Sparano was hired as the new offensive coordinator for the New York Jets, signing a three-year deal. Sparano was fired on January 7, 2013 after the Jets' offense performed extremely poorly, with an offense ranked 30th out of the 32 teams in the NFL.

On January 23, 2013, Sparano was hired to the dual roles of assistant head coach and offensive line coach by the Oakland Raiders. He was expected to work closely with new offensive coordinator Greg Olson and head coach Dennis Allen to restore the angle-blocking scheme favored by star running back Darren McFadden, following the Raiders' disappointing 2012 offensive showing. After an 0-4 start to the 2014 season, the Raiders promoted Sparano to interim head coach on September 30, 2014 after firing head coach Dennis Allen. Sparano was not retained under new head coach Jack Del Rio.

On January 22, 2015, the San Francisco 49ers announced Sparano would be their new tight ends coach under new head coach Jim Tomsula.

On January 13, 2016, the Minnesota Vikings announced Sparano would be their new offensive line coach. Sparano's final game before his death in July 2018 was the 2018 NFC Championship Game, where the Vikings would get blown out by the eventual Super Bowl champion Philadelphia Eagles 7-38.

Personal life and death
Sparano was born in West Haven, Connecticut. He became known for wearing sunglasses, even during instances of relatively low lighting, due to an accident he suffered while working in a fast food restaurant at age 17 that damaged his eyesight and made sunglasses medically necessary. He was a tireless volunteer for the West Haven Ray Tellier Midget Football league which is now the RTMFL West Haven Pop Warner Football league. He spent countless hours not only coaching West Haven youths, but shaping their futures in the best possible way. 

Sparano and his wife, Jeanette, had three children: sons Anthony Michael (currently an assistant offensive line coach with the New York Giants) and Andrew (a coach at Feather River Community College) both played college football at Albany, while daughter Ryan Leigh is a classically trained French pastry chef.

On July 19, 2018, Sparano was hospitalized in Eden Prairie, Minnesota after suffering from chest pains. He was released the following day, but died two days later at the age of 56. Following an autopsy, it was confirmed that Sparano died of arteriosclerotic heart disease.

Head coaching record

College

NFL

* – Interim head coach

References

External links

1961 births
2018 deaths
American football centers
American people of Italian descent
Boston University Terriers football coaches
Cleveland Browns coaches
Dallas Cowboys coaches
Jacksonville Jaguars coaches
Miami Dolphins head coaches
National Football League offensive coordinators
New Haven Chargers football coaches
New Haven Chargers football players
New York Jets coaches
Minnesota Vikings coaches
Oakland Raiders coaches
Oakland Raiders head coaches
People from West Haven, Connecticut
San Francisco 49ers coaches
Washington Redskins coaches
Deaths from arteriosclerosis
Deaths from coronary artery disease